Marc Robbins (January 3, 1868 – April 5, 1931) was an American actor of the silent era. He appeared in 78 films between 1914 and 1923. He died in Los Angeles, California.

Morey was from Topeka, Kansas, and he acted with the Morey Stock Company there. After his father's death, he and his mother moved to California, and he began working in films.

Selected filmography
 The Master Key (1914)
 Judge Not; or The Woman of Mona Diggings (1915)
 The Star of the Sea (1915)
 An International Marriage (1916)
 Secret Love (1916)
 A Tale of Two Cities (1917)
 When a Man Sees Red (1917)
 The Heart of a Lion (1917)
 Riders of the Purple Sage (1918)
 Alias Jimmy Valentine (1920)
 Li Ting Lang (1920)
 The Girl Who Ran Wild (1922)

References

External links

1868 births
Place of birth missing
1931 deaths
American male film actors
American male silent film actors
20th-century American male actors
American male stage actors
Male actors from Kansas